Peder Ree Pedersen (1 April 1913 – 19 June 1976) was a Norwegian politician for the Christian Democratic Party.

He served as a deputy representative to the Norwegian Parliament from Rogaland during the term 1954–1957. Halfway through the term, in 1956, he moved up as a regular representative to replace Endre Kristian Vestvik who had died.

Pedersen was born in Stavanger and a member of the executive committee of Stavanger city council during the term 1947–1951.

References

External links

1913 births
1976 deaths
Politicians from Stavanger
Christian Democratic Party (Norway) politicians
Members of the Storting
20th-century Norwegian politicians